Sir Arnold Savage II (ca. 1382 – 1420), of Bobbing, Kent, was an English politician.

Family
Savage was the son and heir of Sir Arnold Savage I. He married, c. April 1399, Katherine Scales (died 6 November 1436), daughter of Roger de Scales, 4th Baron Scales, by Joan Northwood, daughter of John Northwood of Kent.

Career
Savage was knighted before October 1414. Savage was a Member of Parliament for Kent November 1414.

References

1382 births
1420 deaths
People from Bobbing, Kent
English knights
English MPs November 1414